1990-Sick is the fourth studio album by American rapper Spice 1, released December 5, 1995, on Jive Records. The album was produced by Ant Banks, Blackjack, Bosko, Chase and Clint "Payback" Sands. It peaked at number 3 on the Billboard Top R&B/Hip-Hop Albums and at number 30 on the Billboard 200. One single, "1990-Sick (Kill 'em All)", peaked at number 91 on the Billboard Hot R&B/Hip-Hop Songs and at number 18 on the Billboard Rap Songs. The album features guest appearances by MC Eiht, E-40, Kokane, Joya, Young Kyoz and G-Nut of 187 Fac.

Along with singles, music videos were released for two songs: "1990-Sick (Get 'Em All)" featuring MC Eiht, and an alternate version of "Ain't No Love" featuring Levitti on the chorus instead of Joya. G-Nut makes a cameo appearance in "1990-Sick (Get 'em All)".

Background 
After wrapping up recording 1990-Sick, Spice turned himself in to Oakland police. The rapper was forced to lay low during the summer of 1995 while making the album, since police were armed with a warrant for his arrest on illegal weapons charges. In between hiding and recording, he made a video for his first single, "1990-Sick (Get 'em All)." After serving two weeks in prison, he was released due to overcrowding.

Critical reception 
AllMusic – "...Building from a solid West Coast hip-hop base, Spice 1 adds ragamuffin and dancehall flourishes, which makes him distinctive as an MC... Spice 1 is an engaging rapper..."

The Source – "...The way he switches flows from semi-automatic fire to fully automatic is enough to make you overlook the weak points of the CD. Spice may be 1990-SICK, but he's still 187-Pure."

Track listing

Samples
Dirty Bay
"(Sittin' On) the Dock of the Bay" by Otis Redding
Mind of a Sick Nigga
"Friends" by Whodini
Sucka Ass Niggas
"Sucker M.C.'s (Krush Groove 1)" by Run-DMC
Snitch Killas
"Pusherman" by Curtis Mayfield

Charts

Weekly charts

Year-end charts

Singles

References

External links 
 1990-Sick at Discogs
 "1990-Sick (Kill 'em All)" (single) at Discogs
 "Ain't No Love" (single) at Discogs

Spice 1 albums
1995 albums
Albums produced by Ant Banks
Albums produced by Bosko
Jive Records albums
G-funk albums